Yoon Yong-ho (born 6 March 1996) is a South Korean football midfielder who plays for Cheonan City FC.

He started his career at Suwon Bluewings before joining Daejeon Citizen on a free transfer during the Spring of 2019.

In the Summer of 2019 he joined Jeonnam Dragons on loan until the end of the 2019 K League 2 season.

In 2020, he joined Seongnam FC of K League 1.

References

External links 
 

1996 births
Living people
Association football midfielders
South Korean footballers
Suwon Samsung Bluewings players
Daejeon Hana Citizen FC players
Jeonnam Dragons players
K League 1 players
K League 2 players